Senator Seay may refer to:

Edward T. Seay ( 1869–1941), Tennessee State Senate
Valencia Seay (born 1953), Georgia State Senate